UFC 285: Jones vs. Gane was a mixed martial arts event produced by the Ultimate Fighting Championship that took place on March 4, 2023, at the T-Mobile Arena facility in Paradise, Nevada, part of the Las Vegas Metropolitan Area, United States.

Background

A UFC Heavyweight Championship bout for the vacant title between former two-time UFC Light Heavyweight Champion Jon Jones and former interim champion Ciryl Gane headlined the event. Former champion Francis Ngannou was stripped of the title on January 14 and released from the promotion due to a contract dispute. Sergei Pavlovich served as backup and potential replacement for this fight.

A UFC Women's Flyweight Championship bout between current champion Valentina Shevchenko and Alexa Grasso served as the event's co-main event.

A women's strawweight bout between former UFC Women's Strawweight Championship challenger and inaugural Invicta FC Atomweight Champion Jessica Penne and Tabatha Ricci took place at the event. They were previously scheduled to meet at UFC Fight Night: Dern vs. Yan but the bout was scrapped as Penne withdrew due to illness.

A welterweight bout between Geoff Neal and Shavkat Rakhmonov took place at this event. They were previously expected to meet at UFC Fight Night: Strickland vs. Imavov but Neal withdrew due to injury. At the weigh-ins, Neal weighed in at 175 pounds, four pounds over the welterweight non-title fight limit. The bout proceeded at catchweight and Neal was fined 30% of his purse, which went to Rakhmonov. 

A middleweight bout between promotional newcomer Bo Nickal and Jamie Pickett took take place at this event. They were previously expected to meet at UFC 282 but Nickal withdrew due to injury.

A bantamweight bout between former UFC Bantamweight Champion Cody Garbrandt and Julio Arce was expected to take place at the event. However, Arce withdrew in late January due to a knee injury and was replaced by Trevin Jones.

A lightweight bout between Jalin Turner and Dan Hooker was scheduled for the event. However, Hooker was forced to withdraw from the event citing a hand injury. He was replaced by former KSW Featherweight and Lightweight Champion Mateusz Gamrot.

A lightweight bout between Kamuela Kirk and Esteban Ribovics was scheduled for the event. However, Kirk withdrew from the event for undislcosed reasons and was replaced by Loik Radzhabov.

Also at the weigh-ins, Leomana Martinez weighed in at 137 pounds, one pound over the bantamweight non-title fight limit. The bout proceeded at catchweight with Martinez being fined 30% of his purse, which went to his opponent Cameron Saaiman.

Road House, a remake of the 1989 film of the same name, had some of its scenes filmed during fight week, featuring actor Jake Gyllenhaal and UFC veteran Jay Hieron. It included a weigh-in scene and an actual fight sequence that was shot after the last bout of the early preliminary card, including UFC cage announcer Bruce Buffer and MMA referee Chris Tognoni.

Results

Bonus awards
The following fighters received $50,000 bonuses.
Fight of the Night: Shavkat Rakhmonov vs. Geoff Neal
Performance of the Night: Jon Jones, Alexa Grasso, and Bo Nickal

Notes

See also 

 List of UFC events
 List of current UFC fighters
 2023 in UFC

References 

 

Ultimate Fighting Championship events
2023 in mixed martial arts
Events in Paradise, Nevada
2023 in sports in Nevada
March 2023 sports events in the United States